Tylomelania towutica is a species of freshwater snail with an operculum, an aquatic gastropod mollusk in the family Pachychilidae.

The specific name towutica is after Lake Towuti where it lives.

Distribution 
This species occurs in Lake Towuti and in the Tominanga River, in south Sulawesi, Indonesia. Its type locality is lake Towuti, Loeha Island.

Description

Ecology 
Tylomelania towutica is a lacustrine species.

The females of Tylomelania towutica usually have 1-7 embryos in their brood pouch. Newly hatched snails of Tylomelania towutica have a shell height of 0.5-9.3 mm.

Human use
It is a part of ornamental pet trade for freshwater aquaria.

References

towutica
Gastropods described in 1913